The following is a list of periodicals and online magazines published in the Malayalam language.

General interest, news and literature 

Thejas 
Weekly
Print

Agriculture

Family

Business and economics

Children's magazines and comics

Education and career

Film

Health

Home

Science and technology

Society and women

Spiritual and astrology

Travel

References

External links 
 Registrar of Newspapers for India

Malayalam
 
Malayalam-language magazines
periodicals
Malayalam